HMS Earnest was an "thirty-knotter" torpedo boat destroyer of the British Royal Navy. She was built by Laird, Son & Company at their Birkenhead shipyard as one of six s ordered as part of the Royal Navy's 1895–1896 construction programme, which were later classified as members of the B-class. Earnest was launched on 7 November 1896 and was completed in November 1897.

Earnest served in the Mediterranean from 1898 to 1907, before returning to Britain. She remained in service in the First World War, being employed on patrol and convoy escort duties in the North Sea and Irish Sea. Earnest was sold for scrap on 7 January 1920.

Design and construction
Earnest was ordered on 23 December 1895 as the first of six 30-knotter destroyers programmed to be built by Lairds under the 1895–1896 shipbuilding programme for the Royal Navy. These followed on from four very similar destroyers ordered from Lairds as part of the 1894–1895 programme.

Displacement was  light and  full load.

Armament was the standard for the 30-knotters, i.e. a QF 12 pounder 12 cwt ( calibre) gun on a platform on the ship's conning tower (in practice the platform was also used as the ship's bridge), with a secondary armament of five 6-pounder guns, and two 18-inch (450 mm) torpedo tubes. The ship had a crew of 63 officers and men.

Earnest was laid down at Laird's Birkenhead shipyard as Yard number 621 on 2 March 1896 and was launched on 7 November 1896. Earnest reached  during sea trials. She was completed in November 1897.

Service
In 1897 Earnest was in reserve at Devonport. She was transferred to the Mediterranean Squadron in September 1898, and was in August 1901 recommissioned at Malta as tender to the battleship HMS Caesar. Lieutenant Philip Agnew Bateman-Champain was in command from November 1901. She visited Greek waters (including Nauplia) in September 1902. Earnest returned to Home waters in 1907.

Earnest was a member of the Eastern group of destroyers based at Harwich in 1908, entering refit at Chatham Dockyard in September that year. In February 1910, Earnest, by now a member of the Nore Destroyer Flotilla, was again under refit at Chatham.

On 30 August 1912 the Admiralty directed all destroyers were to be grouped into classes designated by letters based on contract speed and appearance. As a four-funneled 30-knotter destroyer, Earnest was assigned to the B Class. In 1912, older destroyers were transferred to patrol flotillas, with Earnest forming part of the 7th Destroyer Flotilla, based at Devonport, by March 1913. In November 1913, Earnest was under repair at Sheerness Dockyard following a collision with another destroyer.  Earnest remained part of the 7th Flotilla on the eve of the First World War in July 1914.

At the outbreak of war, the 7th Flotilla was redeployed to the Humber River for operations off the East coast of Britain. Duties of the Flotilla were to prevent enemy ships from carrying out minelaying or torpedo attacks in the approaches to ports on the East coast, and to prevent raids by enemy ships. Earnest was still part of the 7th Flotilla in June 1917, while in July was listed as part of the East Coast Convoy Flotilla, although in August Earnest had returned to the 7th Flotilla, which was recorded as being involved in East Coast Convoys. By October, Earnest was listed as being part of the Local Defence Flotilla for the Nore, where she remained in February 1918. By March, Earnest was one of seven destroyers making up the Irish Sea Flotilla, which by July had been renamed the Irish Sea Hunting Flotilla. She remained part of the Irish Sea Hunting Flotilla at the end of the war in November 1918, and was based at Kingstown (now Dún Laoghaire) in the South of Ireland.

Earnest was sold for scrap to the shipbreakers S. Castle of Plymouth on 7 January 1920.

Pennant numbers

References

Bibliography
 
 
 
 
 
 
 
  
 
 
 

 

Earnest-class destroyers
Ships built on the River Mersey
1896 ships
B-class destroyers (1913)
World War I destroyers of the United Kingdom